This article is a list of diseases of flax (Linum usitatissimum and other Linum spp.).

Fungal diseases

Virus and phytoplasma diseases

Miscellaneous diseases or disorders

See also
 Teleomorph, anamorph and holomorph

References

External links 
 Common Names of Diseases, The American Phytopathological Society

Flax
Fiber plant diseases
Flax